Zamia purpurea is a species of plant in the family Zamiaceae. It is endemic to Mexico, where it occurs only in the states of Oaxaca and Veracruz. It grows in the understory of rainforests. It is affected by habitat destruction.

References

purpurea
Endemic flora of Mexico
Flora of Oaxaca
Flora of Veracruz
Critically endangered plants
Endangered biota of Mexico
Taxonomy articles created by Polbot